Aurélien Lohrer (born 28 April 1981) is a French freestyle skier. He competed in the men's aerials event at the 2006 Winter Olympics.

References

1981 births
Living people
French male freestyle skiers
Olympic freestyle skiers of France
Freestyle skiers at the 2006 Winter Olympics
Sportspeople from Grenoble